Clarisse Crémer is a French female professional sailor born on 30 December 1989 in Paris. She is an offshore sailor having competed extensively in the Figaro class before progressing to the IMOCA 60.

Crémer's 12th place in the 2020–2021 edition of the Vendée Globe, with a time of 87 days, 2 hours and 24 minutes, is the world record for a single-handed, non-stop, monohull circumnavigation by a woman.

Results Highlights

References

External links
 
 

1989 births
Living people
Sportspeople from Paris
French female sailors (sport)
IMOCA 60 class sailors
French Vendee Globe sailors
2020 Vendee Globe sailors
Vendée Globe finishers
Single-handed circumnavigating sailors
21st-century French women